Endonuclease VIII-like 2 is an enzyme that in humans is encoded by the NEIL2 gene.

NEIL2 belongs to a class of DNA glycosylases homologous to the bacterial Fpg/Nei family. These glycosylases initiate the first step in base excision repair by cleaving bases damaged by reactive oxygen species and introducing a DNA strand break via the associated lyase reaction (Bandaru et al., 2002)[supplied by OMIM]

References

Further reading

Human proteins